Comet Peak is a mountain peak in Lincoln County, Nevada, United States.
The peak is 9,341 feet in elevation.

See also
Comet (disambiguation)

References

Landforms of Lincoln County, Nevada
Mountains of Nevada